Helicigona trizona  is  a species of small air-breathing land snail, a terrestrial gastropod mollusc in the family Helicidae, the true snails.

Subspecies
Subspecies within this species include:
 Helicigona trizona rumelica (Rossmässler, 1838)

Distribution
This species is not listed in IUCN red list and not evaluated (NE) 

It occurs in countries including:
 Hungary

References

External links
 https://www.biolib.cz/en/taxon/id268974

Helicidae
Gastropods described in 1838